Vigor Shipyards is the current entity operating the former Todd Shipyards after its acquisition in 2011.  Todd Shipyards was founded in 1916, which owned and operated shipyards on the West Coast of the United States, East Coast of the United States and the Gulf.  Todd Shipyards were a major part of the Emergency Shipbuilding Program for World War II.

Vigor Shipyards
In February 2011, Vigor Industrial purchased Todd for US$130 million. This included the Seattle, Everett and Bremerton operations. Today, Vigor Shipyards is a government repair subsidiary of Vigor Industrial.

Originally, the Coast Guard wanted to acquire 25 Offshore Patrol Cutters (OPC) and spend about $8 billion for them. In April 2013, it was reported that Vigor proposed an Ulstein X-bow hull in the design competition for the OPC vessels. If successful in landing the contract, Vigor would have assembled the vessels at its Portland, Ore., shipyard. However, in February 2014, the USCG announced that Bollinger Shipyards, Eastern Shipbuilding, and General Dynamics Bath Iron Works had been awarded design contracts for the OPC.

In September 2017, Vigor was contracted to produce the US Army's Maneuver Support Vessel (Light).

Todd Shipyards 

Todd Shipyards was founded in 1916 as the William H. Todd Corporation when properties of the Tietjen & Lang Dry Dock Company of Hoboken, New Jersey were bought in 1916 by a syndicate headed by Bertron Griscom & Company of New York and placed under management of William H. Todd president of the Robins Dry Dock & Repair Co., Erie Basin, Brooklyn, New York. That acquisition was followed by acquisition of the Tebo Yacht Basin, Brooklyn, and the Seattle Construction and Dry Dock Company.

The Seattle shipyard traces its history back to 1882, when Robert Moran opened a marine repair shop at Yesler's Wharf. This shop became the Moran Brothers Shipyard in 1906 and the Seattle Construction & Dry Dock Company at the end of 1911.

The shipyard has performed building and maintenance work for, among others, the U.S. and Royal Australian Navies, the United States Coast Guard, and the Washington State Ferries. Its headquarters and operations are on Harbor Island at the mouth of Seattle's Duwamish Waterway. Todd ranked 26th among United States corporations in the value of World War II production contracts.

The  hull of Disneyland's Mark Twain riverboat was built at Todd Shipyards in San Pedro, California, in 1955.  Frank Sinatra worked after high school as a rivet catcher at Todd Shipyard in Hoboken, New Jersey. From 1940 to 1945, during World War II, Todd shipyard's built or repaired 23,000 ships is many shipyards with 57,000 workers. Todd Shipyards came out of Chapter 11 protection in 1991, and continues shipyard on the west coast. In 1995 Todd brached out and started a radio subsidiary campany called Elettra Broadcasting Corporation. Elettra Broadcasting opereted three FM radio stations in Carmel.

Locations

Vigor current locations
Vigor currently operates four shipyards, in the Pacific Northwest:
 Seattle, Washington
 established at the location in 1918
 Bremerton, Washington
 Everett, Washington
 near the site of the former Everett-Pacific Shipbuilding & Dry Dock Company
 Portland, Oregon
 on the site of the former Swan Island Shipyard

Todd Shipyards locations

 #Brooklyn
 #Hoboken
 #Alameda
 #Galveston
 #Houston Irish Bend
 #Houston Green Bayou

New York

Todd Brooklyn. Todd Shipyard's first shipyard was in Brooklyn, New York, along the waterfront of the Red Hook neighborhood. William H. Todd purchased the Robins Dry Dock & Repair Company in 1916. Robins Dry Dock was founded in 1869, as Handren and Robins. The company was renamed J. N. Robins Co. in 1892 after Handren's death. J. N. Robins Co. merged with the Erie Basin Dry Dock Company, started by Delamater Iron Works, and renamed the Campony Robins Dry Dock & Repair.  William H. Todd had worked for both Erie Basin and Robins Dry Dock.  Todd and some of his associates also purchased the Tietjen & Lang Dry Dock Company of Hoboken in Weehawken Cove, and the Seattle Construction and Drydock Company on the West Coast. The Tebo Yacht Basin Company was the last of the four initial acquisitions in 1916. It operated till 1937 when it was sold and became the Sullivan Drydock and Repair Corporation. The Erie Basin yard was sold in 1986 to Rodermond Industries which closed in the 1990s.  Red Hook graving dock was a   graving dock located at site. In 1917 Todd purchased the Gowanus shipyard in Brooklyn. 1916–1965

 For the United States Navy:

 9 of 49 s (1918 - 1919, in the Tebo Yacht Basin, no more than 3 built concurrently)
  ... ,  ... 

 conversion Robins DD
  (1941)
  (1940)
  (ca. 1941)
 See also: Two-Ocean Navy Act#AUX_ANV
 conversion Tietjen and Lang
  (1940)
  (1940)
  (1940)
 
 

 conversion (unspecified) of
  (1943)
  (1943)
  (1944)
  (1944)
  (1944)
  (1945)
  (1945)
  (1945)
 USAHS Frances Y. Slanger (1945)
  converted back to merchant (1947)
  (1953)

Los Angeles and San Francisco

 Todd Pacific Shipyards, Los Angeles Division, San Pedro, California, was formerly Los Angeles Shipbuilding & Dry Dock Corporation, opened in 1917 and closed in 1989. From 1918 to 1924 Los Angeles Shipbuilding built cargo ships for the United States Shipping Board. In the 1920 and 1930 Los Angeles Shipbuilding built tankers and ferries. For World War II they yard built the USS Ajax (AR-6), USS Hector (AR-7), USS Jason (AR-8), Seaplane tender and Klondike-class destroyer tenders. Post war the yard was sold to Todd. Todd built Allende-class frigate at the site and in Seattle, also built were Shenandoah-class destroyer tender and Leahy-class cruiser. The yard closed was following completion of its  contract and after failing to win an  contract. Property is now part of the Port of Los Angeles, and has been completely converted into Berth 100 / West Basin Container Terminal.

 Todd Alameda (San Francisco Division), Alameda, California. to the west of Webster Street. Opened in 1940 by the United Engineering Company. Mostly used as a repair or conversion facility, it was closed in 1956. The Bethlehem Alameda Works Shipyard to the east of Webster Street was leased by Todd according to, but the Corps of Engineers survey 1953 claims it was owned and operated by Bethlehem. 

Richmond shipyard No. 1 was a new shipyard built to support the demand for ships for World War 2. Kaiser purchased the contact and the Richmond yard to built type Ocean ship from the Todd Shipyards in 1940. Todd then Kaiser built yard No. 1 to build the Ocean ships. Yard No. 1 was built on unoccupied land with construction starting in December 1940. In April 1941 the keel for the first British bound Ocean ship was laid. The next series of ships built were Liberty ships, with the first keel laid on May 15, 1942. Needing faster cargo ships the next series of ships built were Victory ships, with the first keel laid on January 17, 1944. After the war, in 1946, the yard closed. Kaiser Richmond No. 1 Yard was at 700 Wright Ave, Richmond on the Parr Canal. The site now has general docks for construction supplies. Located at GPS . Built at Kaiser Richmond No. 1 Yard:* Ocean ship, 30 cargo ships, 7,174 GRT.

Puget Sound, Washington

Todd Tacoma Division, Commencement Bay, Tacoma, Washington opened in 1917 to build Design 1014 ship ships for the United States Shipping Board. It operated as part of Todd Dry Dock & Construction until shut down after World War I in 1924. The yard reopened in partnership with Kaiser Shipbuilding in 1939 as Seattle-Tacoma Shipbuilding Corporation. The yard built 56  and s and various auxiliaries. In 1942 Todd bought out Kaiser's share and the yard eventually became part of Todd Pacific Shipyards. Sold to the Navy after World War II, further sold to the Port of Tacoma in 1959. The site today is the Commencement Bay Industrial Development District.

 Todd Dry Dock & Construction Co. of Seattle, Washington was started in 1916 when Todd bought Seattle Construction & Dry Dock Co. Ltd. Seattle Construction & Dry Dock Co. Ltd. was in the past Seattle Dry Dock & Shipbuilding Company started by Robert Moran and his brothers as ship repair shop in Seattle in 1882. The yard was destroyed by fire in 1889 and then rebuilt as Moran Brothers Company. After the war the yard was renamed Todd Shipyards Corp., Seattle Division. For the US Navy built Charles F. Adams-class destroyer, Knox-class frigates, Oliver Hazard Perry-class frigates, Hamilton-class cutters. The yard is now owned and operated by Vigor.

Todd Bremerton Shipyard in Bremerton, Washington is a satellite ship repair yard. Close to the Puget Sound Naval Shipyard. Todd Bremerton Shipyard works on US Navy ships. 

Todd Everett Shipyard in 2008 Tood purchased Everett Shipyard, Inc. in Everett, Washington. The site, Everett Ship Repair & Drydock, Inc., will continue ship repair work. The yard as since 1960 served the Washington State Ferries and the United States Navy.

Houston / Galveston

Todd Galveston, Texas opened in 1934. Todd took over the Galveston Dry Dock & Construction on Pelican Island. In 1943 Todd took over the yard next door,  Gray's Iron Works and renamed the yards Todd Galveston Drydocks, Inc..  For World War II the yard built T1 Tankers T1-M-A1. Post-war they built three ferries for Texas. In 1949 Todd moved the main operation to the Brown Shipbuilding yard in Houston that they had leased. The Pelican Island Galveston yard was used only for ship repair and in 1965 also started tanker conversions, as Todd Shipyards Corporation, Galveston Division. Todd Galveston built Type C6 ships. Todd Galveston yard went into Chapter 11 and closed in 1990. The yard was sold. The yard had two Panamax floating dry-docks that were moved to the Alabama Shipyard and Bender Shipbuilding. In 1993, the remainder of Todd Galveston on Pelican Island was sold to the Port of Galveston. It is now part of Newpark Marine, Gulf Copper runs an offshore repair yard there. Southwest Shipyard now operates a shipyard at the side.

Todd Houston Shipbuilding, in Houston, Texas, was an emergency shipyard operated by Todd Shipbuilding Corp. and Kaiser Corp. to build ships for World War II. The company was formally established on 6 January 1941. The yard was built at Irish Bend (a former island in the Houston Ship Channel) . During the war Todd Houston employed 23,000 workers built 208 Liberty ships and 14 T1-M-BT2 tankers. In 1946, after the war the yard closed. In 1949 the Brown Shipbuilding yard in Houston, now Todd's became known as Todd Houston.

 Facilities (MCc-ESP-3, MCc-ESP-604, MCc-19054): $13,081,267.95

 208 EC2-S-C1 (built July 1941 - March 1945)
 MCc-ESP-12, $34,586,494.42
 Sam Houston (MC-95) ... Joseph T. Robinson (MC-119)
 only built on ways 1 through 6
 MCc-ESP-602, $16,447,537.33
 Stephen F. Auston (MC-265) ... Stephen C. Foster (MC-276)
 only built on ways 7, 8, 9
 MCc-ESP-603, $33,333,892.35
 William Eustis (MC-828) ... E. A. Peden (MC-859)
 MCc-13099, $32,293,383.60
 Sam Houston II (MC-1936) ... Henry Austin (MC-1966)
 MCc-15923, $91,389,292.53
 Charles Morgan (MC-2420) ... Isaac Van Zandt (MC-2431)
 John G. Tod (MC-2908) ... Edward N. Hinton (MC-3003)
 14 T1-M-BT2 (delivered July 1945 - December 1945)
 DA-MCc-859, $12,983,883.50
 Tarascon (MC-2636) ... Taveta (MC-2649)

 Total fees and profits received on all the cost-plus contracts: $7,510,000

 First keel laid on slipways 1 through 9
 23 October 1941
 23 October 1941
 25 July 1941
 25 July 1941
 18 July 1941
 18 July 1941
 23 October 1941
 30 December 1941
 30 December 1941

 refs: 

Todd Houston on the Buffalo Bayou was opened in 1949, when Todd took over the Brown Shipbuilding's yard at Green's Bayou. Todd ran the yard as a barge construction and repair shop. Todd closed the operation in 1987 selling to Platzer Shipyard. The yard returned to Brown, which renamed it Brown & Root, a construction facility for the offshore drilling industry, which closed in 2004. The site is now the Brown Shipbuilding Industrial.

Other

Todd New Orleans, in 1934 Todd joined with Johnson Iron Works in New Orleans to build and repair shipyard called Todd-Johnson Dry Docks. Todd took over the yard and in 1987 sold the yard to Port of New Orleans, which leases to Avondale Ship Repair. In 

Todd-Bath Iron Shipbuilding Corporation at South Portland, Maine opened in 1940 as an emergency shipyards to build Ocean class cargo ships for Britain. At the two yards , they built Liberty ships, closing after the war. The Corporation was renamed New England Shipbuilding in 1943 after Kaiser sold its shares in the corporation. Durning the was New England Shipbuilding employed 30,000 workers.

Oregon Shipbuilding Company of Portland, Oregon opened as a World War II emergency yard by Todd and Kaiser. Built in 1941 it opened with 8 shipways, with the high demand for ships it grew to 8 shipways. Soon after the shipyard opened Kaiser bought out Todd share in the shipyard. The yard built Liberty ships and Victory Ships. The yard closed after the war.

 Todd Charleston, from 1946 to 1949 Todd operated for the US Navy the Charleston Dry Dock & Machine Company as repair yard. The yard was located in Charleston, South Carolina, on the Cooper River .  32.788711, -79.924533

New Jersey Shipbuilding Company, at the US Navy's request for World War II Todd took over New Jersey Shipbuilding to build LCI. Landing Craft LCI(L) in 1942, the yard closed after the war. The yard was in Perth Amboy, New Jersey , the site is now Chevron asphalt plant. 

Todd Mobile Drydock, Alabama. In 1936 this repair yard was leased to the nearby Alabama Drydock and Shipbuilding Company and stripped.

References

External links

Ships built at Todd Dry Dock, Seattle-Tacoma, and Todd Pacific at ShipbuildingHistory.com

Shipbuilding companies of the United States
Companies based in Seattle
Vehicle manufacturing companies established in 1916
American companies established in 1916
Privately held companies of the United States
Shipbuilding in Washington (state)
 
Shipyards of New Jersey